Mount Ester is a mountain over  high, surmounting the western part of the McKay Cliffs in the Geologists Range in Antarctica. It was mapped by the United States Geological Survey from Tellurometer surveys and Navy air photos, 1960–62, and was named by the Advisory Committee on Antarctic Names for Donald W. Ester, a United States Antarctic Research Program geologist at McMurdo Station, 1962–63.

References 

Mountains of Oates Land